An image organizer or image management application is application software for organising digital images. It is a kind of desktop organizer software application.

Image organizer software focuses on handling large numbers of images. In contrast to an image viewer, an image organizer can edit image tags and can often upload files to on-line hosting pages. Enterprises may use Digital Asset Management (DAM) solutions to manage larger and broader amounts of digital media.

Some programs that come with desktop environments such as gThumb (GNOME) and digiKam (KDE) were originally simple image viewers, and have evolved into image organizers.

Common image organizers features 
 Multiple thumbnail previews are viewable on a single screen and printable on a single page. (Contact Sheet)
 Images can be organized into albums
 Albums can be organized into collections
User roles and permissions enable controlled access to certain images while preventing access to others. 
 Adding tags (also known as keywords, categories, labels or flags). Tags can be stored externally, or in industry-standard IPTC or XMP headers inside each image file or in sidecar files.
 Share: Resizing, exporting, e-mailing and printing.

Not so common, or differentiating features 
 Pictures can be organized by one or more mechanisms
 Images can be organized into folders, which may correspond to file-system folders.
 Images may be organized into albums, which may be distinct from folders or file-system folders.
 Albums may be organized into collections, which may not be the same as a folder hierarchy.
 Grouping or sorting by date, location, and special photographic metadata such as exposure or f-stops if that information is available. See Exif for example.
 Images can appear in more than one album
 Albums can appear in more than one collection
 Grouped or stacking of images within an album, by date, time, and linking copies to originals.
 Adding and editing titles and captions
 Simple or sophisticated search engines to find photos
 Searching by keywords, caption text, metadata, dates, location or title
 Searching with logical operators and fields, such as "(Title contains birthday) and (keywords contain cake) not (date before 2007)"
 Separate backing up and exporting of metadata associated with photos.
 Retouching of images (either destructively or non-destructively)
 Editing images in third-party graphical software and then re-incorporating them into the album automatically
 Stitching to knit together panoramic or tiled photos
 Grouping of images to form a slideshow view
 Exporting of slideshows as HTML or Flash presentations for web deployment
 Synchronizing of albums with web-based counterparts, either third-party (such as Flickr), or application specific (such as Lightroom or Phase One Media Pro).
 Retention of Exif, IPTC and XMP metadata already embedded in the image file itself

Two categories of image organizers 
 Automatic image organizers. These are software packages that read data present in digital pictures and use this data to automatically create an organization structure. Each digital picture contains information about the date when the picture was taken. It is this piece of information that serves as the basis for automatic picture organization. The user usually has little or no control over the automatically created organization structure. Some tools create this structure on the hard drive (physical structure), while other tools create a virtual structure (it exists only within the tool).
 Manual image organizers. This kind of software provides a direct view of the folders present on a user's hard disk. Sometimes referred to as image viewers, they allow the user only to see the pictures but do not provide any automatic organization features. They give maximum flexibility to a user and show exactly what the user has created on their hard drive. While they provide maximum flexibility, manual organizers rely on the user to have their own method to organize their pictures. Currently there are two main methods for organizing pictures manually: tag and folder based methods. While not mutually exclusive, these methods are different in purposes, procedures, and outcomes. 

Many commercial image organizers offer both automatic and manual image organization features. A comparison of image viewers reveals that many free software packages are available that offer most of the organization features available in commercial software.

Future of image organization 
There are several imminent advances anticipated in the image organization domain which may soon allow widespread automatic assignment of keywords or image clustering based on image 
content:
 colour, shape and texture recognition (For example, Picasa experimentally allows searching for photos with primary colour names.)
 subject recognition
 fully or semi-automated facial, torso or body recognition (For example, FXPAL in Palo Alto experimentally extracts faces from images and measures the distance between each face and a template.)
 geo-temporal sorting and event clustering. Many software will sort by time or place; experimental software has been used to predict special events such as birthdays based on geo-temporal clustering.
In general, these methods either:
 automatically assign keywords based on content, or
 measure the distance between an untagged image and some template image which is associated with a keyword, and then propose that the operator apply the same keyword(s) to the untagged images

Notable image organizers

See also 
 Image viewers
 Image retrieval
 Digital asset management
 Comparison of image viewers
 Comparison of photo gallery software
 Desktop organizer
 Personal wiki

References

Further reading 
 Multimedia Information Retrieval and Management: Technological Fundamentals and Applications by David Feng, W.C. Siu, Hong J. Zhang
 Multimedia Networking: Technology, Management, and Applications by Syed Mahbubur Rahman
 Multimedia and Image Management by Susan Lake, Karen Bean

Graphics software